Karl Maximilian von Bauernfeind (28 November 1818 – 3 August 1894) was a German geodesist and civil engineer.

Education 
At the age of 18, Bauernfeind studied under Georg Ohm at the Polytechnic School in Nuremberg. Two years later, he studied mathematics and physics at the Ludwig Maximilian University of Munich and passed the state examination in 1841.

Career 
After gaining practical experience as an engineer during the construction of the Ludwig South-North Railway, he became associate professor of geodesy at the Königlich polytechnischen Schule in Munich in 1846 and full professor in 1851.

In 1846, Bauernfeind presented a new revision of the theory of bridge vaults, which remained authoritative for a long time. Five years later, he invented the prismatic cross (including the Bauernfeind prism), a device that soon became a valuable tool for geodesists because of its accuracy.

In 1856, his Elemente der Vermessungskunde (Elements of Surveying) was published, which became the standard work of this young science for decades. In 1857, he undertook barometric height measurements in the Alps; this was the first time that the influence of the thermal radiation of the earth's surface was clearly recognized. In 1864, he made a detailed study of atmospheric refraction.

In 1865 he became an associate member of the Bavarian Academy of Sciences and in 1870 was accepted as a full member. In 1873 he was elected a member of the German National Academy of Sciences Leopoldina.

From 1868, he was the founding director of the Polytechnischen Schule München, which would later become the Technical University of Munich. There, he shaped geodesy into a scientific discipline. After relinquishing the directorship in 1874, he held this post again from 1880 to 1889.

References 

1894 deaths
1818 births
Members of the Bavarian Academy of Sciences
Academic staff of the Technical University of Munich
Presidents of the Technical University of Munich
German geodesists
20th-century German engineers
Bridge engineers
Ludwig Maximilian University of Munich alumni